Timepieces Vol. II Live in the Seventies is the fourth live album released in 1983 by Eric Clapton.

Track listing
"Tulsa Time" (Danny Flowers) – 4:02
"Knockin' on Heaven's Door" (Bob Dylan) 06:27 - Previously unreleased
"If I Don't Be There by Morning" (Bob Dylan, Helena Springs) 04:12
"Ramblin' On My Mind" (Trad., arr. Eric Clapton) 08:54
"Presence of the Lord" (Clapton) – with Derek and the Dominos 06:05
"Can't Find My Way Home" (Steve Winwood)* - 05:21
"Smile" (Chaplin, Parsons, Phillips)* - 3:41
"Blues Power" (Clapton, Leon Russell) - 7:34

Produced by Jon Astley (except (*) produced by Tom Dowd)

1–4 and 8 – Recorded live December 1979 at the Budokan Theatre, Tokyo and, except for 2, previously released on Just One Night.
5 – Recorded live at the Fillmore East 1970 with Derek and the Dominos. Previously released on In Concert.
6 and 7 – Recorded live 20 July 1974 at the Long Beach Arena, Long Beach, California.  Track 6 previously released on E.C. Was Here, Track 7 Previously released on the 10" RSO sampler album Prime Cuts in May 1975.

Credits
Jon Astley – Engineer, Mixing, Producer
Philip Chapman – Mixing
Tom Dowd – Producer, Remastering
Richard Manwaring – Remastering
Andy Knight – Remastering
Eddie Kramer – Engineer

Band members
Eric Clapton – Arranger, Guitar, Vocals
Yvonne Elliman – Vocals
Jim Gordon – Drums
Albert Lee – Guitar, Keyboards, Vocals
Marcy Levy – Tambourine
Dave Markee – Bass
Jamie Oldaker – Drums
Carl Radle – Bass
Dick Sims – Organ
Henry Spinetti – Drums
Chris Stainton – Keyboards
George Terry – Guitar
Bobby Whitlock – Organ, Vocals

1983 live albums
Eric Clapton live albums
Polydor Records compilation albums
Polydor Records live albums
Albums produced by Jon Astley
Eric Clapton compilation albums
1983 compilation albums